is a railway station on the Fujikyuko Line in the city of Tsuru, Yamanashi, Japan, operated by Fuji Kyuko (Fujikyu). The station is at an altitude of 467 metres.

Lines

Station layout
The station is staffed and consists of an island platform serving two tracks, with the station building located on the east (down) side of the tracks. Passengers cross the track to the platform via a level crossing. It has a waiting room and toilet facilities.

Platforms

Adjacent stations

History
Tsurushi Station opened on 19 June 1929, initially named . It was renamed Tsurushi on 1 March 1965.

Passenger statistics
In fiscal 1998, the station was used by an average of 831 passengers daily.

Surrounding area
 Yamura Hydroelectric Power Station (the second oldest hydroelectric power station in Japan)

See also
 List of railway stations in Japan

References

External links

 Fujikyuko station information 

Railway stations in Yamanashi Prefecture
Railway stations in Japan opened in 1929
Stations of Fuji Kyuko
Tsuru, Yamanashi